Aarón Padilla Gutiérrez (10 July 1942 – 14 June 2020) was a Mexican football striker, who played for the Mexico national team between 1965 and 1970, gaining 55 caps and scoring 8 goals.

Biography
He was part of the Mexico squad for the 1966 and 1970 World Cups.

At club level, Padilla played for Pumas, Atlante, and Veracruz.

On 14 June 2020, Padilla died from COVID-19 during the COVID-19 pandemic in Mexico.

References

External links
 
 

1942 births
Footballers from Mexico City
Association football forwards
Mexico international footballers
1966 FIFA World Cup players
1970 FIFA World Cup players
Club Universidad Nacional footballers
Atlante F.C. footballers
C.D. Veracruz footballers
Liga MX players
Mexican footballers
2020 deaths
Deaths from the COVID-19 pandemic in Mexico